George Ricker Berry, D.D., Ph.D., (15 October 1865 24 May 1945) was an internationally known Semitic scholar and archaeologist, and Professor Emeritus of Colgate-Rochester Divinity School.  The Interlinear Greek-English New Testament (the Englishman's Greek New Testament apparently created by Thomas Newberry), of which American editions are generally published with Berry's Lexicon and New Testament Synonyms, is a widely used Bible study aid.

Family
George Ricker Berry was born 15 October 1865 to William Drake Berry and Joanna Floyd Lawrence in West Sumner, Maine, USA. He was the sixth of ten children. Berry married Carrie Leola Clough (1877 4 March 1909), in Liberty, Waldo, Maine, on 17 August 1893. They had three children, Hilda Marion Berry (17 March 1895 April 1974), Miriam Clough (b. April 5, 1897), Lawrence Worthing (22 June 1903 30 July 1936). After Carrie died, he married Edith Van Wagner. Berry died on Thursday, 24 May 1945, in Cambridge, Massachusetts he was 79 years old.

Education
Berry received his A.B. degree from Colby College in 1885, and graduated from Newton Theological Institution in 1889. He was one of the first students to attend the University of Chicago when the new school opened in 1892, where he studied Semitic languages. After earning his Ph.D. in 1895, he was an instructor there for a year. In 1896 he was appointed Instructor of Semitic Languages at Colgate University. When Assyriologist Nathaniel Schmidt left Colgate and went to Cornell that year, Berry continued Schmidt's history course. He was promoted to Professor in 1897 and in the following years expanded the Assyriological offerings at Colgate. Berry was a member of Delta Upsilon fraternity.

Written works
 Book of Ruth in Encyclopedia Americana at WikiSource

References

External links

 7 articles by Berry in International Standard Bible Encyclopedia

1865 births
1945 deaths
Colby College alumni
Translators of the Bible into English
University of Chicago alumni
Colgate University faculty